Now That's What I Call Music! 21 may refer to two different "Now That's What I Call Music!"-series albums, including:
 Now That's What I Call Music! 21 (original UK series, 1992 release)
 Now That's What I Call Music! 21 (U.S. series, 2006 release)